Headstrong Games was a subsidiary of Kuju Entertainment based in London that developed video games.

History
The studio was formed in 2000 as Kuju London. In 2008, it was rebranded as Headstrong Games.

In 2013, Headstrong Games was included in the Develop 100 Studio Hot List.

In 2017, Kuju Entertainment shifted focus to contract game development. Consequently, this led to Headstrong games and their resources, along with their sister studio Zoë Mode, to be amalgamated into Kuju.

Games

As Kuju London

Reign of Fire (2002)
Battalion Wars (2005)
 Terror Strike (2006)
Battalion Wars 2 (2007)

As Headstrong Games

Art Academy (2009)
The House of the Dead: Overkill (2009)
Lord of the Rings: Aragorn's Quest (2010)
The Sorcerer's Apprentice (2010)
Top Gun: Hard Lock (2012)
Art Academy: Lessons for Everyone! (2012)Rabbids Rumble (2012)Art Academy: SketchPad (2013)Pokémon Art Academy (2014)Art Academy: Home Studio (2015)Disney Art Academy'' (2016)

See also
Kuju Entertainment
Zoë Mode

References

External links
Official website

 
Companies based in the London Borough of Islington
Video game development companies
British companies established in 2000
British companies disestablished in 2017
Video game companies established in 2000
Video game companies disestablished in 2017
Defunct video game companies of the United Kingdom
Defunct companies based in London
2000 establishments in England
2017 disestablishments in England